The European Realistic Disobedience Front, or MeRA25, is a left-wing Greek political party founded in 2018. Its founder and General Secretary is former Syriza MP and Finance Minister Yanis Varoufakis. MeRa25 is part of the Democracy in Europe Movement 2025 (DiEM25), the European Spring and the Progressive International.

A party of the same name, allied with the Greek party, was founded in Germany in 2021.

Background 
MeRA25 was founded on 27 March 2018 by former Greek Minister of Finance Yanis Varoufakis. The party's formation was announced during a special event in Athens. In December 2018 former Syriza member and MEP Sofia Sakorafa joined the party.

The party contested the 2019 European Parliament election as part of DiEM25. It narrowly failed to win a European Parliament seat. In the 2019 Greek legislative elections, MeRA25 gained 9 seats and 3.44% of the vote.

Name 
Without capitalisation, the letters of ΜέΡΑ25, μέρα (mera), spell the Greek word for "day", mirroring the Latin diem and thus showing the party's connection with DiEM25.

Positions 
The party presents itself as an alliance of "Left, Green and Liberal Greeks", standing on the grounds European internationalism, economic rationality and social emancipation. It plans to introduce a "European Green New Deal", as a solution to the postmodern version of the Great Depression. In Greece, its core 7 legislative policy proposals are:

Restructuring the national debt
 Reducing primary surpluses
 Creating a public debt restructuring company
 The general reduction of tax rates
 Creating a public digital payment platform
 Converting HRADF into a development bank
 Respecting paid work and creative entrepreneurship

Election results

Hellenic Parliament

European Parliament

See also 
 Anti-austerity movement in Greece
 Civil disobedience
 Civil resistance
 Democracy in Europe Movement 2025
 European United Left–Nordic Green Left
 Syriza

References

External links
Official website
Official DiEM25 website

2018 establishments in Greece
Democratic socialist parties in Europe
Multicultural parties in Greece
Organizations based in Athens
Political parties established in 2018
Political parties in Greece
Pro-European political parties in Greece
Progressive International
Progressive parties
Socialist parties in Greece
Syndicalist political parties